Anne-Léontine Nicolas Amieux (18 June 1871 – 1960?) was a French educator. She was principal of the École normale supérieure de jeunes filles at Sèvres from 1919 to 1936.

She was born in Lyon and was educated at the girls' lycée there. She continued her studies at the École normale supérieure de jeunes filles at Sèvres where she received her qualification to teach science. In 1905, she was awarded a travel bursary by the philanthropist Albert Kahn. She was a founding member of the Association française des femmes diplômées des universités and also served on the council for the International Federation of University Women.

Amieux taught at a girls' lycée in Tournon-sur-Rhône and at the Lycée Victor-Hugo in Paris. She was founding principal at the Lycée Jules-Ferry.

In 1933, she was named a Chevalier in the French Legion of Honour.

References 

1871 births
People from Lyon
Year of death uncertain
Heads of schools in France
Chevaliers of the Légion d'honneur